Bonik Barta is a Bengali-language daily newspaper of Bangladesh. The newspaper is publishing from Dhaka. The name of the editor of the newspaper is Dewan Hanif Mahmud. In 2018, the circulation of the newspaper was 134,000.

References

Newspapers published in Dhaka
Bengali-language newspapers published in Bangladesh
Daily newspapers published in Bangladesh